Amphinomidae, also known as the bristle worms or sea mice, are a family of marine polychaetes, many species of which bear chaetae mineralized with carbonate.  The best-known amphinomids are the fireworms, which can cause great pain if their toxin-coated chaetae are touched or trodden on.  Their relationship to other polychaete groups is somewhat poorly resolved.

Complanine 
Complanine is a quaternary ammonium salt that has been isolated from the marine fireworm Eurythoe complanata. It causes an inflammatory effect upon contact with the skin or mucous membranes.

It was previously known that handling the fireworm caused it to release a chemical that induces inflammation of the skin of marine predators and mammals (including humans). Complanine was the first compound isolated from the fireworm which causes these effects.  It is presumed that this compound's function is to deter predators of the fireworm.

Species

Most genera in Amphinomidae  are divided into two subfamilies: Amphinominae, and Archinominae.

 Ankitokazoa Alessandrello & Bracchi, 2005†
 Ankitokazoa bezanozanoi Alessandrello & Bracchi, 2005†
 Bathynotopygos Kucheruk, 1981
 Bathynotopygos abyssalis Kucheruk, 1981
 Pherecardites Horst, 1912
 Pherecardites parva Horst, 1912
 Pherecardites quinquemaculata Augener, 1927
 Sangiria Horst, 1911
 Sangiria hystrix Horst, 1911
 Zothea Risso, 1826
 Zothea meridionalis Risso, 1826

Amphinominae Lamarck, 1818
 Alleurythoe Sun & Li, 2017
 Alleurythoe tenuichaeta Sun & Li, 2017
 Amphinome Bruguière, 1789
 Amphinome bruguieresi Quatrefages, 1866
 Amphinome carnea Grube, 1856
 Amphinome nigrobranchiata Horst, 1912
 Amphinome praelonga Haswell, 1878
 Amphinome rostrata (Pallas, 1766)
 Amphinome savignyi Brulle, 1832
 Amphinome stylifera Grube, 1860
 Amphinome umbo Grube, 1870
 Amphinome vagans (Savigny, 1822)
 Benthoscolex Horst, 1912
 Benthoscolex coecus Horst, 1912
 Benthoscolex cubanus Hartman, 1942
Benthoscolex microcarunculata (Treadwell, 1901)
 Benthoscolex seisuiae Jimi, Kimura, Ogawa & Kajihara, 2018
 Branchamphinome Hartman, 1967
 Branchamphinome antarctica Hartman, 1967
 Branchamphinome islandica Detinova, 1986
 Branchamphinome tropicalis Barroso, Ranauro & Kudenov, 2017
 Cryptonome Borda, Kudenov, Bienhold & Rouse, 2012
 Cryptonome barbada Barroso, Kudenov, Halanych, Saeedi, Sumida & Bernardino, 2018
 Cryptonome conclava Borda, Kudenov, Bienhold & Rouse, 2012
 Cryptonome parvecarunculata (Horst, 1912)
 Cryptonome turcica (Çinar, 2008)
 Eurythoe Kinberg, 1857
 Eurythoe brasiliensis Hansen, 1882
 Eurythoe clavata Baird, 1868
 Eurythoe complanata (Pallas, 1766)
 Eurythoe dubia Horst, 1912
 Eurythoe encopochaeta (Schmarda, 1861)
 Eurythoe hedenborgi Kinberg, 1857
 Eurythoe indica (Schmarda, 1861)
 Eurythoe karachiensis Bindra, 1927
 Eurythoe laevisetis Fauvel, 1914
 Eurythoe longicirra (Schmarda, 1861)
 Eurythoe matthaii Bindra, 1927
 Eurythoe paupera (Grube, 1856)
 Eurythoe rullieri Fauvel, 1953
 Eurythoe syriaca Kinberg, 1857
 Hermodice Kinberg, 1857
 Hermodice carunculata (Pallas, 1766)
 Hermodice sanguinea (Schmarda, 1861)
 Hermodice savignyi (Brulle, 1832)
 Hermodice smaragdina (Schmarda, 1861)
 Hipponoe Audouin & Milne Edwards, 1830
 Hipponoe gaudichaudi Audouin & Milne Edwards, 1830
 Linopherus Quatrefages, 1866
 Linopherus abyssalis (Fauchald, 1972)
 Linopherus acarunculatus (Monro, 1937)
 Linopherus ambigua (Monro, 1933)
 Linopherus annulata (Hartmann-Schröder, 1965)
 Linopherus beibuwanensis Sun & Li, 2016
 Linopherus brevis (Grube, 1878)
 Linopherus canariensis Langerhans, 1881
 Linopherus fauchaldi San Martín, 1986
 Linopherus hemuli (Fauchald, 1972)
 Linopherus hirsuta (Wesenberg-Lund, 1949)
 Linopherus incarunculata (Peters, 1854)
 Linopherus kristiani Salazar-Vallejo, 1987
 Linopherus microcephala (Fauvel, 1932)
 Linopherus minuta (Knox, 1960)
 Linopherus oculata (Treadwell, 1941)
 Linopherus oculifera (Augener, 1913)
 Linopherus oligobranchia (Wu, Shen & Chen, 1975)
 Linopherus paucibranchiata (Fauvel, 1932)
 Linopherus reducta (Kudenov & Blake, 1985)
 Linopherus spiralis (Wesenberg-Lund, 1949)
 Linopherus tripunctata (Kudenov, 1975)
 Paramphinome M. Sars in G. Sars 1872
 Paramphinome australis Monro, 1930
 Paramphinome besnardi Temperini in Amaral & Nonato, 1994
 Paramphinome grandis Gustafson, 1930
 Paramphinome indica Fauvel, 1932
 Paramphinome jeffreysii (McIntosh, 1868)
 Paramphinome pacifica Fauchald & Hancock, 1981
 Paramphinome posterobranchiata Barroso & Paiva, 2008
 Paramphinome splendens Gustafson, 1930
 Paramphinome trionyx Intes & Le Loeuff, 1975
 Pareurythoe Gustafson, 1930
 Pareurythoe americana Hartman, 1951
 Pareurythoe borealis (M. Sars, 1862)
 Pareurythoe californica (Johnson, 1897)
 Pareurythoe chilensis (Kinberg, 1857)
 Pareurythoe elongata (Treadwell, 1931)
 Pareurythoe gracilis Gustafson, 1930
 Pareurythoe japonica Gustafson, 1930
 Pareurythoe parvecarunculata (Horst, 1912)
 Pareurythoe pitipanaensis De Silva, 1965
 Pareurythoe spirocirrata (Essenberg, 1917)
 Pherecardia Horst, 1886
 Pherecardia maculata Imajima, 2003
 Pherecardia parva Monro, 1924
 Pherecardia polylamellata Silva, 1960
 Pherecardia striata (Kinberg, 1857)

Archinominae Kudenov, 1991
 Archinome Kudenov, 1991
 Archinome jasoni Borda, Kudenov, Chevaldonné, Blake, Desbruyères, Fabri, Hourdez, Pleijel, Shank, Wilson, Schulze & Rouse, 2013
 Archinome levinae Borda, Kudenov, Chevaldonné, Blake, Desbruyères, Fabri, Hourdez, Pleijel, Shank, Wilson, Schulze & Rouse, 2013
 Archinome rosacea (Blake, 1985)
 Archinome storchi Fiege & Bock, 2009
 Archinome tethyana Borda, Kudenov, Chevaldonné, Blake, Desbruyères, Fabri, Hourdez, Pleijel, Shank, Wilson, Schulze & Rouse, 2013
 Bathychloeia Horst, 1910
 Bathychloeia balloniformis Böggemann, 2009
 Bathychloeia sibogae Horst, 1910
 Chloeia Lamarck, 1818
 Chloeia amphora Horst, 1910
 Chloeia australis Kudenov, 1993
 Chloeia bengalensis Kinberg, 1867
 Chloeia bistriata Grube, 1868
 Chloeia candida Kinberg, 1857
 Chloeia conspicua Horst, 1910
 Chloeia egena Grube, 1855
 Chloeia entypa Chamberlin, 1919
 Chloeia flava (Pallas, 1766)
 Chloeia furcigera Quatrefages, 1866
 Chloeia fusca McIntosh, 1885
 Chloeia inermis Quatrefages, 1866
 Chloeia kudenovi Barroso & Paiva, 2011
 Chloeia macleayi Haswell, 1878
 Chloeia maculata Potts, 1909
 Chloeia malaica Kinberg, 1867
 Chloeia nuda Quatrefages, 1866
 Chloeia parva Baird, 1868
 Chloeia pinnata Moore, 1911
 Chloeia pseudeuglochis Augener, 1922
 Chloeia quatrefagesii Baird, 1868
 Chloeia rosea Potts, 1909
 Chloeia rupestris Risso, 1826
 Chloeia tumida Baird, 1868
 Chloeia venusta Quatrefages, 1866
 Chloeia violacea Horst, 1910
 Chloeia viridis Schmarda, 1861
 Chloenopsis Fauchald, 1977
 Chloenopsis atlantica (McIntosh, 1885)
 Notopygos Grube, 1855
 Notopygos albiseta Holly, 1939
 Notopygos andrewsi Monro, 1924
 Notopygos caribea Yáñez-Rivera & Carrera-Parra, 2012
 Notopygos cirratus Horst, 1911
 Notopygos crinita Grube, 1855
 Notopygos flavus Haswell, 1878
 Notopygos gardineri Potts, 1909
 Notopygos gigas Horst, 1911
 Notopygos gregoryi Holly, 1939
 Notopygos hispida Potts, 1909
 Notopygos horsti Monro, 1924
 Notopygos kekooa Borda, Yanez-Rivera, Ochoa, Kudenov, Sanchez-Ortiz, Schulze & Rouse, 2017
 Notopygos labiatus McIntosh, 1885
 Notopygos megalops McIntosh, 1885
 Notopygos mitsukurii Izuka, 1910
 Notopygos ornata Grube, 1856
 Notopygos parvus Haswell, 1878
 Notopygos rayneri (Baird, 1868)
 Notopygos splendens (Kinberg, 1857)
 Notopygos subpragigas Uschakov & Wu, 1962
 Notopygos variabilis Potts, 1909
 Parachloeia Horst, 1912
 Parachloeia marmorata Horst, 1912

Subfamily not assigned
 †Rollinschaeta Parry, Wilson, Sykes, Edgecombe & Vinther, 2015 
 †Rollinschaeta myoplena Parry, Wilson, Sykes, Edgecombe & Vinther, 2015

Notes

References

External links

Polychaetes